A one in, one out policy is a method used to control the number of people in one place or building at any one time.  Where a place or building has reached its maximum capacity, further entry is only allowed upon a person leaving.  It is especially used in nightclubs and bars, and most military establishments.

References

Queue management